John Denton may refer to:

John Denton (fl. 1413–1416), MP for Huntingdon (UK Parliament constituency)
John Denton (died 1576), MP for Banbury (UK Parliament constituency)
John B. Denton (1806–1841), American Methodist Episcopal Church minister and soldier
John Bailey Denton (1814–1893), British surveyor and civil engineer
John Denton (cricketer) (1890–1971), English cricketer 
John Denton (architect) (fl. 1970s–2000s), Australian architect